Platycypha pinheyi is a species of damselfly in the family Chlorocyphidae. It is found in the Democratic Republic of the Congo and Tanzania.

Sources

Chlorocyphidae
Insects described in 1950
Taxonomy articles created by Polbot